Paul Müller may refer to:

 Paul Muller (actor) (1923–2016), Swiss actor
 Paul Müller (biologist) (1941–2010), German biologist
 Paul Müller (gymnast) (born 1946), Swiss Olympic gymnast
 Paul Müller (ice hockey) (1886–?), Swiss ice hockey player
 Paul Hermann Müller (1899–1965), Swiss chemist
 Paul J. Mueller (1892–1964),  United States Army officer
 Paul Milford Muller (1937–2013), American engineer and businessman
 Paul O. Müller, German physicist
 Paul Mueller, alleged early 20th century serial killer responsible for between 40 and 100 deaths in the United States and Germany
 Paul Heinrich Theodor Müller, German member of the SS at Auschwitz concentration camp